Michael Goff is a publisher and entrepreneur.

Michael Goff is also the name of:
Mike Goff (baseball) (born 1962), baseball coach
Mike Goff (American football) (born 1976), American football guard

See also
Michael Gough (disambiguation)